Joachim Streich (13 April 1951 – 16 April 2022) was a German footballer who won the bronze medal with East Germany at the 1972 Summer Olympics in Munich.

Playing career
Born in Wismar, Streich played as a striker for Aufbau Wismar from 1957 to 1963, TSG Wismar from 1963 to 1967, Hansa Rostock from 1967 to 1975, and 1. FC Magdeburg from 1975 to 1985.

Between 1969 and 1984 he was capped 102 times for East Germany, scoring 55 goals. For a long time he was considered a member of the FIFA Century Club, but when FIFA changed regulations to no longer include games at the Olympic Games, four of his matches were deleted from his official FIFA record and he dropped out. The German Football Association still lists Streich with 102 caps on their website.

Streich is regarded as one of the best players for East Germany and holds both the records for most appearances and goals scored for the national team. Streich took part in the 1974 FIFA World Cup, scoring 2 goals in 4 matches.

During his career, Streich played 378 games in the DDR-Oberliga for F.C. Hansa Rostock and 1. FC Magdeburg, scoring a record 229 goals. This tally earned him the top scorer award four times. He also scored 17 goals in 42 European matches for Rostock (4/0) and Magdeburg (38/17). In 1979 and 1983 he won the East German Footballer of the Year award. He also set the all-time DDR-Oberliga record for most goals scored in a game when he netted six in 1. FC Magdeburg's 10–2 defeat of BSG Chemie Böhlen in August 1977.

Coaching career
Following the end of his playing career, Streich managed 1. FC Magdeburg, Eintracht Braunschweig and FSV Zwickau.

Career statistics

International goals
Scores and results list East Germany's goal tally first, score column indicates score after each Streich goal.

Honours
 FDGB-Pokal: 1978, 1979 and 1983
 Olympic football tournament: Bronze medal 1972
 East German Footballer of the Year: 1979, 1983

References

1951 births
2022 deaths
People from Wismar
German footballers
East German footballers
East German football managers
German football managers
Footballers from Mecklenburg-Western Pomerania
East Germany international footballers
Association football forwards
Olympic footballers of East Germany
Footballers at the 1972 Summer Olympics
1974 FIFA World Cup players
FC Hansa Rostock players
1. FC Magdeburg players
1. FC Magdeburg managers
Eintracht Braunschweig managers
2. Bundesliga managers
FIFA Century Club
DDR-Oberliga players
FSV Zwickau managers
Olympic medalists in football
Medalists at the 1972 Summer Olympics
Olympic bronze medalists for East Germany
People from Bezirk Rostock
FC Anker Wismar players